Lam Kwok-Hung, is a Hong Kong actor, best known for his role as Superintendent Raymond Li in Jackie Chan's Police Story and Police Story 2.

Film career
Lam started acting in 1980 at the age of 22, in his first film, The Mortal Storm. He became well known after starring in Jackie Chan's action film Police Story as Superintendent Raymond Li, alongside Bill Tung, Maggie Cheung, Brigitte Lin and Chan himself. Lam reprised his role again in the highly successful sequel, Police Story 2, but would not return for further sequels.

Lam's last film and starring role to date was in Lucky Way (1992).

Personal life
In 1985, Lam married Hong Kong actress and Cantopop singer Amy Chan (陳秀雯). They have one son. In 2013, it was confirmed that the couple had split.

Filmography
 The Mortal Storm (1980)
 Lucky Breaks (1981)
 Dangerous Person (1981)
 Challenge of Chasing Girls (1984)
 Police Story (1985) - Superintendent Raymond Li
 Mr. Vampire II (1986) - cameo
 Project A II (1987) - cameo
 Police Story 2 (1988) - Superintendent Raymond Li
 Lucky Way'' (1992)

See also
 Police Story
 Jackie Chan
 Amy Chan

References

External links
 Hong Kong Cinemagic: Lam Gwok Hung
 Lam Gwok Hung
 

1958 births
Hong Kong male film actors
Living people